Ticha Reservoir (yazovir Ticha) is a reservoir in Varbitsa Municipality, Shumen Province, northeastern Bulgaria, located to the north and northeast of the town of Varbitsa. It is one of the largest lakes of Bulgaria. The Ticha Dam is located in the northeastern part of the reservoir, in the southeastern part of Kotel Mountain.

The reservoir lies along the Golyama Kamchia River, one of the two rivers that merge to form the Kamchia. Before entering the reservoir, the river gathers waters from the hilly Gerlovo region. The name of the reservoir is derived from the medieval name of the Kamchia: the Ticha.

According to some measurements, it is the third-largest reservoir in Bulgaria. The construction of the reservoir meant that two villages, Vinitsa and Staroselka, were depopulated and flooded; their commons now lie within the reservoir.

The dam overflowed in July 2005 and July 2010, threatening the surrounding villages and land. Due to this, the water level of the reservoir is closely monitored and dykes have been built. Unlike the 2005 flood, which caused significant damage in the village of Byal Bryag, the 2010 overflow did not lead to floods in the neighbouring populated places.

In February 2010, the tap water in Shumen, which comes from the Ticha Reservoir, was declared unsuitable for drinking as a result of the presence of E. coli strains.

References

Reservoirs in Bulgaria
Landforms of Shumen Province